Maavesi is a medium-sized lake of Southern Savonia, in eastern Finland.

See also
List of lakes in Finland

References

Lakes of Pieksämäki
Lakes of Joroinen